Associated Group (AG) was founded in 1965 by Iqbal Z. Ahmed and his father  Z. Z. Ahmed (1910-1989), a former Deputy Inspector General of Pakistan Police. Today, AG is one of Pakistan's leading business houses in the energy sector. AG is Pakistan's largest producer, transporter and marketer of liquefied petroleum gas (LPG). AG is also in the power generation, design and conservation, aviation, and media sectors.

Companies
AG companies include Pakistan Power Resources (PPR), Jamshoro Joint Venture Limited (JJVL), Lub Gas, Mehran LPG, Pakistan GasPort Limited, AG Omnimedia, AG Publications (which publishes Newsweek Pakistan), Associated Estate Developers (AEDL), and Phoenix Aviation. AG has its headquarters at Lahore and offices in Islamabad and Karachi. It has LPG and power generation facilities in Attock, Dera Ghazi Khan, Hyderabad, Larkana, and Sheikhupura. AG's philanthropic efforts are directed through the Zohra and Z. Z. Ahmed Foundation.

Acclaim
AG Chairman Ahmed has been featured in Newsweek International and Forbes, and profiled on CNBC Pakistan.
JJVL, Pakistan's single largest producer of LPG which represents post-9/11 foreign direct investment, has been recognised by its peers in the global energy world becoming a finalist six times, four years in a row, at the Platts Global Energy Awards held annually in New York.

References

External links
Associated Group (AG)
Rental power for Pakistan, Forbes, July 2009
Barnstormer, Forbes, July 2009

Conglomerate companies of Pakistan